Gipsy Hill ward is an administrative division of the London Borough of Lambeth, England.

The ward contains much of West Norwood, as well as Norwood Park and West Norwood Cemetery; it also contains Gipsy Hill railway station. The ward is located in the Dulwich and West Norwood Parliamentary constituency.

Charlie Elphicke, former Member of Parliament for Dover and Deal was the ward councillor here from 1994 to 1998.

Lambeth Council elections

External links
Lambeth Borough Council profile for the ward
Gipsy Hill ward results on Lambeth website
Gipsy Hill Labour Action Team

Wards of the London Borough of Lambeth